Maximillian Nicholson (born 3 October 1971) is an English former professional footballer who played as a left winger.

Career
Nicholson began his career as a trainee with Doncaster Rovers and was given his professional debut in 1989 by former Scotland captain Billy Bremner. After four years at Belle Vue he moved on to Hereford United, Torquay United and then Scunthorpe United playing in excess of 150 league games.
		
He moved on to play professionally in  the Singapore S. League with former Scunthorpe team-mate Stuart Young for four years and was voted the Straits Times S League player of the year in 1997. 
 
He played for Geylang United and Woodlands and acted as a witness in the match fixing scandal of 2000 as, after being attacked with a hockey stick by the notorious Wilson Raj Perumal along with fellow Woodlands player Ivica Raguz, two S League players, German goalkeeper Lutz Pfannenstiel and Australian defender Mirko Jurilj were jailed for alleged fixing of matches. Nicholson had originally been arrested along with fellow British players from Geylang United, Billy Bone and Brian Bothwell.		 	
		
No charges were brought against Nicholson, he actually played in the game where it was alleged he was to be paid not to play in.
 		 	
Nicholson teamed up with Young for a third time in the National Soccer League of Australia, both playing for Wollongong Wolves FC, winning the national soccer league championship in his first season. He was used mainly as a sub as it was difficult to dislodge Australia international Scott Chipperfield, but achieved something of a cult status amongst Wolves fans. He played 14 times for the Wolves during the 2000–01 and 2001–02 NSL seasons.
 
In July 2002 Nicholson joined Gainsborough Trinity.

References

External links

1971 births
Living people
English footballers
National Soccer League (Australia) players
Singapore Premier League players
Association football wingers
Doncaster Rovers F.C. players
Gainsborough Trinity F.C. players
Hereford United F.C. players
Scunthorpe United F.C. players
Torquay United F.C. players
Wollongong Wolves FC players
Geylang International FC players
English expatriate footballers
English expatriate sportspeople in Australia
Expatriate soccer players in Australia
English expatriate sportspeople in Singapore
Expatriate footballers in Singapore